Stara Huta is a village in northwestern Ukraine, in Kovel Raion of Volyn Oblast, but was formerly administered within Stara Vyzhivka Raion. The population of the village is 1024 people.

History
Between the wars, the village was located in the Second Polish Republic, in the Kostopol County, Volhynia Voivodeship. Up till the Nazi German and Soviet invasions of Poland in September 1939 it was known as Stara Huta. During World War II, the village was the site of Polish and Jewish mass murders between 1942 and 1945, perpetrated by local Ukrainian peasants and the Ukrainian Insurgent Army.

The village endured two raids. The first, took place on the night of 4 March 1944. Around 200 farmhouses were burned down. Around 25–30 were saved partially. At least 30 to 35 villagers were murdered.

The second "pacification" operation took place on 28 February 1945 and this time, the Ukrainians killed all the Poles they encountered, including infants and seniors. At that time, the village was destroyed completely and the remaining inhabitants murdered. Among the murdered were four female members of the Biernacki family; the males had been murdered on 4 March 1944. A local Roman Catholic church, had also been razed. The Ukrainians were led by Pavlo Kirychuk, a member of the OUN(B), who himself was later shot by the UIA for desertion.

References

Sources
  Isakowicz-Zaleski, Tadeusz. Annihilation of Korosciatyn, kki.pl; accessed 13 December 2014.
  Stankiewicz, Janusz. Huta Stara, stankiewicze.com, 2007; accessed 13 December 2014.

See also
Massacres of Poles in Volhynia

Holocaust locations in Ukraine
Massacres in Ukraine

Villages in Kovel Raion